A bronze bust of congressman and Boston Mayor Patrick Collins is installed along Boston's Commonwealth Avenue, in the U.S. state of Massachusetts. The memorial was dedicated in 1908 and relocated in 1966. It features a bust of Collins on a granite base flanked by two bronze female statues representing America and Ireland. The figures are approximately 7 ft. 6 in. tall and 2 ft wide, and the base measures approximately 11 ft. 6 in. x 10 ft. 1 in. x 6 ft. 8 in. The work was surveyed by the Smithsonian Institution's "Save Outdoor Sculpture!" program in 1993.

References

External links
 

1908 establishments in Massachusetts
1908 sculptures
Bronze sculptures in Massachusetts
Busts in Massachusetts
Monuments and memorials in Boston
Outdoor sculptures in Boston
Sculptures of men in Massachusetts
Sculptures of women in Massachusetts
Statues in Boston